John Pelling DD (1670 - 30 March 1750) was a Canon of Windsor from 1715 to 1750.

Career 

He was educated at Christ Church, Oxford where he graduated BA in 1690, MA in 1693, DD in 1703.

He was appointed:

 Rector of St Anne's Church, Soho 1704 - 1750
 Prebendary of Tetenhale in St Paul’s 1705 - 1750

He was appointed to the seventh stall in St George's Chapel, Windsor Castle in 1715 and held the canonry until 1750.

Notes

External links 

1670 births
1750 deaths
Canons of Windsor
Alumni of Christ Church, Oxford